Crime & Punishment is a police drama television program created by Dick Wolf that ran for 6 episodes on NBC from March 3, 1993, to April 7, 1993. With the exceptions of the first and last episodes, which aired on Wednesdays, the show occupied the 10 p.m. slot of the network's Thursday-night "The Best Night of Television on Television" programming block, a timeslot occupied for the rest of the 1992-1993 season by the 7th season of L.A. Law.

Premise
Crime & Punishment followed a "case-of-the-week" format, centering around two LAPD detectives, Ken O'Donnell (Jon Tenney) and Annette Rey (Rachel Ticontin), and their superior officer, Lt. Anthony Bartolo (Carmen Argenziano). Subplots were also developed around O'Donnell's relationship with his long-term girlfriend, a medical student named Jen Sorenson (Lisa Darr), and Rey's relationship with her estranged 17-year-old daughter, Tanya (María Celedonio). 

The program was also notable for including documentary-style "talking-head" segments, wherein the characters are interviewed by an unseen "Interrogator" (voiced by James Sloyan) to reveal their inner thoughts. The "Interrogator" segments were disliked by critics; Ken Tucker of Entertainment Weekly said they "stop the action dead and ruin any ambivalence or subtlety we might read into the characters", while Tony Scott, in Variety, called the device "pretentious and disruptive".

Cast
 Jon Tenney as Det. Ken O'Donnell 
 Rachel Ticotin as Det. Annette Rey
 Carmen Argenziano as Lt. Anthony Bartolo
 Lisa Darr as Jan Sorenson, a medical intern and Ken's girlfriend
 María Celedonio as Tanya Rey, Annette's estranged daughter
 James Sloyan (voice) as the Interrogator

Guest Stars
 Brandon Quintin Adams as Harold Carr ("Right to Bear Arms")
 Xander Berkeley as Michael Vetta ("Simple Trust")
 Susan Brown as Gayle O'Donnell, Ken's mother ("Our Denial")
 David Burke as Sean ("Our Denial")
 Nick Cassavetes as Phil Cooper ("Simple Trust")
 Frances Fisher as Jeannette Henderson ("Fire with Fire")
 Steven Gilborn as John O'Donnell, Ken's father ("Our Denial")
 John Glover as Dennis Atwood ("Best Laid Plans")
 Lauren Lane as Deanna Atlee ("Simple Trust")
 Robert Picardo as Bill Reverdy ("School Ties")

Episodes

Awards and nominations

References

English-language television shows
1990s American crime drama television series
1990s American police procedural television series
1993 American television series debuts
1993 American television series endings
Fictional portrayals of the Los Angeles Police Department
Television shows set in Los Angeles
NBC original programming
Television series by Universal Television
Television series by Wolf Films
Television series created by Dick Wolf